Oktober may refer to:
Forlaget Oktober, a Norwegian publishing house;
Oktober, a character in The Quiller Memorandum;
Oktober (TV series), a British television series;
 Oktober Guitars, American manufacturer of musical instruments

See also

October (disambiguation)